The Leeds and Bradford Extension Railway was an early British railway company in the West Riding of Yorkshire. The Skipton–Colne Line closed in 1970, but the remainder of the line is still in use today, and once formed part of the Midland Railway's main line route from London to Glasgow.

History

Authorisation
The Leeds and Bradford (Shipley–Colne Extension) Railway Act of 30 June 1845 empowered the company to build its line as an extension of the Leeds and Bradford Railway, which was still under construction between Leeds and Bradford. In July 1846, the company was leased to the Midland Railway, which later absorbed it on 24 July 1851.

Opening
A tender for construction was let on 15 October 1845 and the section opened on 16 March 1847. The line included a  tunnel at Bingley.

A second section from Keighley to  opened on 7 September 1847, initially as a single track, but doubled by the end of the year. Trains ran between Bradford and Skipton; passengers to and from Leeds changed at Shipley.

At Colne it was to make an end-on junction with the East Lancashire Railway's Blackburn, Burnley, Accrington and Colne Extension Railway, which did not open until 1 February 1849. By 2 April in the same year the line was part of a through route between Leeds and Liverpool, but the majority of passenger trains were local between Skipton and Colne.

Little North Western Railway
The "Little" North Western Railway built a line, from a junction just west of Skipton, which would eventually become the main line through Skipton. The line was leased to the Midland Railway from 1 January 1859. After the opening of the Midland Railway's Settle-Carlisle Line on 1 May 1876, the Leeds–Skipton Line was used by the Midland's  to Glasgow express trains.

Partial closure
The Beeching cuts of 1963 reduced the services along the Skipton–Colne Line, and on 2 February 1970 this section of line closed.
The Skipton - East Lancashire Rail Action Partnership campaigns to reinstate it.

Surviving section
The Shipley to Skipton Line is still in use as part of the Airedale Line, and also used by trains of the Leeds-Morecambe Line and Settle-Carlisle Line.

Notes

References

Awdry, C. (1990), Encyclopaedia of British Railway Companies, Patrick Stephens Ltd., Wellingborough, 
Bairstow, M. (2000), The "Little" North Western Railway, Martin Bairstow, Leeds, 
Binns, D. (1984), Steam in Airedale, Wyvern Publications, Skipton, 
Dewick, T. (2002), Complete Atlas of Railway Station Names, Ian Allan Publishing, Hersham, Maps 21 and 42
Suggitt, G. (2004 reprint), Lost Railways of Lancashire, Countryside Books, Newbury, 

Early British railway companies
Midland Railway
Companies based in Bradford
Craven District
Rail transport in West Yorkshire
Rail transport in North Yorkshire
Transport in the Borough of Pendle
Railway companies established in 1845
Railway lines opened in 1847
Railway companies disestablished in 1851
Defunct companies based in Yorkshire
1845 establishments in England
British companies disestablished in 1851
British companies established in 1845